The Indiana Intercollegiate Athletic Association was a college athletic conference that existed from 1889 until the early part of the 20th century.  Its members were located in the state of Indiana.

Members
 Butler University
 DePauw University
 Earlham College
 Hanover College
 Indiana State Normal School—now Indiana State University
 Indiana University
 Purdue University
 Rose Polytechnic Institute—now Rose–Hulman Institute of Technology
 Wabash College

Football champions

See also
 List of Indiana Intercollegiate Athletic Association football standings
 List of defunct college football conferences

References

 
Defunct college sports conferences in the United States
College sports in Indiana
Sports organizations established in 1889